

2015 

Spain competed at the 2015 UCI Track Cycling World Championships in Saint-Quentin-en-Yvelines at the Vélodrome de Saint-Quentin-en-Yvelines from 18 to 22 February 2015. A team of 15 cyclists (5 women, 10 men) was announced to represent the country in the event.

Results

Men

Sources

Women

Sources

This page details Spain's participation at the UCI Track Cycling World Championships, the highest level of competition with professional track cycling. Winners of the World Championships are entitled to wear the rainbow jersey within their respective discipline for the following period of one year. Past World Champions are typically signified by with rainbow edging or piping on their jersey and shorts.

2016
The 2016 UCI Track Cycling World Championships were held at the Lee Valley VeloPark in London, United Kingdom from 2–4 March 2016. A team of 15 cyclists (5 women, 10 men) was announced to represent Spain in the event.

Results

Men

Sources

Women

Sources

References

Nations at the UCI Track Cycling World Championships
Spain at cycling events